The International Exposition Center, better known as the I-X Center, is a  convention and exhibition hall located in the Hopkins neighborhood of Cleveland, Ohio, United States, adjacent to Cleveland Hopkins International Airport. The  building included over  total square feet of exhibition and conference space, making it one of the largest meeting, convention, and exhibition centers in the United States. The diverse show schedule included public events featuring one of the country's largest boat shows, trade shows, banquets and meetings attracting over 2 million visitors each year.

History

It was built in 1942 as a General Motors-operated factory and was used to build bombers during World War II as the Cleveland Bomber Plant. For a time, it built the wing assembly for the B-29 Superfortress, then the experimental XP-75.

It later served for many years as a tank factory. The M41 Walker Bulldog, M56 Scorpion, M114, the MOG Howitzer, and the M551 Sheridan were built at the facility.
Former employees of the tank plant reported that there were at least two, maybe three basement levels. One basement had a large pool in it for testing water-tightness of production tanks.

It was vacant from 1970 to 1977, when it was purchased by Park Corp. with the intention of converting it into an exhibition hall. It re-opened in 1985 as the I-X Center. The Park Corp. sold the building to the City of Cleveland in 2001, but continued to lease and operate it until 2021.

In 1990, the I-X Center was used as a temporary home for North Olmsted High School. On September 16, 1990, two students had set fire to the front of the high school, causing significant damage.

The entire ceiling was repainted for the first time since 1984, using 27,000 gallons of paint.

On May 3–4, 2014, the I-X Center hosted the first Pro Football Hall of Fame Fan Fest, which featured appearances by 100 NFL Hall of Famers including Jim Brown, Joe Namath, Barry Sanders, Lynn Swann, Marshall Faulk, Franco Harris, Warren Sapp and Terry Bradshaw. The successful campaign to bring the event to the I-X Center was spearheaded by Cleveland native Tony Gumina. The center also hosted the National Sports Collectors Convention seven times.

In September 2020, the operator, the I-X Center Corporation announced that the facility would close at the end of 2020 due to the COVID-19 pandemic. Gojo Industries leased a portion of the building for inventory storage. The organizers of the Cleveland Boat Show sued the I-X Center Corporation, seeking to have a receiver oversee the company's finances, but later withdrew their suit and opted to pursue mediation. In August 2021, Industrial Realty Group (IRG) acquired the stock of I-X Center Corporation and announced plans to reopen and redevelop the facility. They plan to reallocate part of the interior space.

The Cleveland Crunch indoor soccer team will begin playing home games at the IX Center in the 2022-23 season.

Ferris wheel
It premiered at the 1992 Greater Cleveland Auto Show, at which time it was the world's tallest indoor Ferris wheel. It usually did not operate during trade shows. IRG stated that they would remove it but would attempt to find another maintainer for it. In April, it was announced that the Hall of Fame Village development in Canton would buy and install the Ferris Wheel and zipline there. The Ferris Wheel was removed in June 2022 and reopened as the Red Zone wheel in the Hall Of Fame Village in March 2023.

References

External links

Buildings and structures in Cleveland
Convention centers in Ohio
Manufacturing plants in the United States
Indoor amusement parks
Tourist attractions in Cleveland
Amusement parks in Ohio
1985 establishments in Ohio
2020 disestablishments in Ohio
Defunct amusement parks in Ohio